Yarrowbury is an Iron Age hill fort situated close to Bigbury in Devon, England. The fort is situated on Hilltop to the north east of the village at approximately 80 metres above sea level, overlooking the Avon Estuary.

References

Hill forts in Devon